Fusarium solani f.sp. pisi is a fungal plant pathogen infecting peas.

References

External links
 Index Fungorum
 USDA ARS Fungal Database

solani f.sp. pisi
Fungal plant pathogens and diseases
Vegetable diseases
Forma specialis taxa